The 2017–18 season was Burton Albion's 68th season in their history and second consecutive season in the Championship. Along with competing in the Championship, the club will also participate in the FA Cup and League Cup. The season covered the period from 1 July 2017 to 30 June 2018.

Squad

Statistics

|-
!colspan=14|Player(s) out on loan:

|-
!colspan=14|Player(s) who left the club:

|}

Goals record

Disciplinary record

Transfers

Transfers in

Transfers out

Loans in

Loans out

Pre-season

Friendlies
As of 7 June 2017, Burton Albion have announced ten pre-season friendlies against Leicester City, West Bromwich Albion, Shrewsbury Town, Matlock Town, Mickleover Sports, AFC Wimbledon, Kidsgrove Athletic, Solihull Moors, Rocester and Arnold Town.

Competitions

Championship

League table

Result summary

Results by matchday

Matches
On 21 June 2017, the league fixtures were announced.

FA Cup
In the FA Cup, Burton Albion entered the competition in the third round and were drawn away to Birmingham City.

EFL Cup
On 16 June 2017, the first round draw took place with a trip to Oldham Athletic confirmed. Another away trip against Cardiff City for the second round. A third away tie in the third round was confirmed against Manchester United.

References

Burton Albion F.C. seasons
Burton Albion